The 1908 Nebraska gubernatorial election was held on November 3, 1908.

Incumbent Republican Governor George L. Sheldon was defeated by Democratic nominee Ashton C. Shallenberger.

Primary elections
Primary elections were held on September 1, 1908.

Democratic primary

Candidates
George W. Berge, Fusion candidate for Governor in 1904
James Dahlman, Mayor of Omaha
Ashton C. Shallenberger, Fusion candidate for Governor in 1906

Results

People's Independent primary

Candidates
George W. Berge, Fusion candidate for Governor in 1904
Ashton C. Shallenberger, Fusion candidate for Governor in 1906

Results

Berge withdrew from the candidacy in favour of Shallenberger.

Prohibition primary

Candidates
Rev. Roy R. Teeter

Results

Republican primary

Candidates
George L. Sheldon, incumbent Governor

Results

Socialist primary

Candidates
C. H. Harbaugh
J. W. Walker

Results

General election

Candidates
Major party candidates
Ashton C. Shallenberger, Democratic and People's Independent
George L. Sheldon, Republican

Other candidates
Roy R. Teeter, Prohibition
C. H. Harbaugh, Socialist

Results

Notes

References

Bibliography
 

1908
Nebraska
Gubernatorial